Sadisticon (n.sad-is-ti-con) can refer to:
The collected works of the Marquis de Sade 
 Any book about sadism, or a practitioner of sadism